Segan is a surname. Notable people with the surname include: 

Allison Lyon Segan, American film producer, wife of Lloyd
Lloyd Segan, American film and television producer
Noah Segan (born 1983), American actor

See also
Sagan (disambiguation)